Stormforce  (original Dutch title: Windkracht 10: Koksijde Rescue, literally Gale force 10: Koksijde Rescue) is a 2006 Belgian film directed by Hans Herbots. The screenplay was written by Pierre De Clercq.

The series was based on the Flemish TV series Windkracht 10.

Cast
Veerle Baetens as Alex Breynaert
François Beukelaers as General Cassiman
Warre Borgmans as Jean Louis Hubert De Jonghe
Ludo Busschots as Patrick Adams
Jelle Cleymans as Bert Gorissen
Jaela Cole as Yvonne
Axel Daeseleire as Koen
Koen De Bouw as Mark Van Houte
Vic de Wachter as Bob Govaerts
Eric Godon as the Defence minister
Kevin Janssens as Rick Symons
Tine Reymer as Marleen
Stan Van Samang as Serge Helsen
Nicolas Gob as Tigris Sailor

External links
 

Belgian action films
2006 films
Films shot at Pinewood Studios
Films based on television series
Belgium in fiction
Koksijde
2006 action films